Pachybathron is a genus of very small sea snails, marine gastropod mollusk  or micromollusk  in the subfamily Cystiscinae of the family Cystiscidae.

Species
Species within the genus Pachybathron include:
Pachybathron cassidiforme Gaskoin, 1853
Pachybathron cypraeoides (Adams, 1845)
 Pachybathron guadeloupense Boyer & Lamy, 2014
Pachybathron kienerianum (Petit de la Saussaye, 1838)
Pachybathron olssoni Wakefield, Boyer & McCleery, 2002
Pachybathron tayrona Díaz & Velásquez, 1987

Synonym:
 Pachybathron guadeloupensis Boyer & Lamy, 2014: synonym of Pachybathron guadeloupense Boyer & Lamy, 2014 (wrong gender agreement of specific epithet)
Pachybathron marginelloideum Gaskoin, 1853: synonym of Pachybathron cypraeoides (Adams, 1845)

References

 Paulmier G. (1997). Trois mollusques nouveaux du plateau insulaire martiniquais. Annales de la Société des Sciences Naturelles de la Charente-Maritime. 8(6): 733-748.

Cystiscidae